Edwin Alberto Villafuerte Posligua (born 12 March 1979) is an Ecuadorian former goalkeeper who last played for Club Deportivo Quevedo.

Club career
Once dubbed ‘Ecuador’s New Hands’, goalkeeper Villafuerte found it difficult to sustain a first team spot at Barcelona SC behind Jose Cevallos. In order to get more regular football, he moved to Deportivo Quito in January 2006.

International career
As a youngster, he was included in Ecuador’s squad for the 1995 FIFA U-17 World Championship. In that tournament he kept clean sheets against the United States and Japan.

With Villafuerte in goal, Ecuador beat Brazil and Argentina at home in their 2006 FIFA World Cup qualifying campaign, keeping clean sheets on both occasions.

He has 15 international caps as of June 15, 2006. Since the 2006 FIFA World Cup, it appeared coach Luis Fernando Suarez had completely discarded Villafuerte. However, he was called up for the 2010 World Cup qualifiers against Paraguay and Peru, the latter of which he made an appearance against.

References

External links

1979 births
Living people
Sportspeople from Guayaquil
Ecuadorian footballers
Ecuador international footballers
2006 FIFA World Cup players
Association football goalkeepers
Barcelona S.C. footballers
S.D. Quito footballers
C.D. Olmedo footballers
C.D. Técnico Universitario footballers
C.D. ESPOLI footballers
Deportivo Pereira footballers
Expatriate footballers in Colombia
Ecuadorian expatriate footballers
C.D. Quevedo footballers